Luzbelito is the eighth album by Argentine rock band Patricio Rey y sus Redonditos de Ricota, released in 1996. In 2007, the Argentine edition of Rolling Stone ranked it 88th on its list of "The 100 Greatest Albums of National Rock".

Background 
Luzbelito is a concept album, based on a fictional child of the Devil called "Luzbelito", plays with the ambiguities of human beliefs and behaviors from different points of view.

The recording began in Brazil on "Be Bop" Studios, São Paulo and then in Fort Lauderdale, Florida on "New River" Studios. Back in Buenos Aires, the mixing was completed in El Pie. Two songs on this album were re-recorded: "Blues de la libertad" and "Mariposa Pontiac", which were part of the Patricio Rey first demo, in 1982.

The tour began in Santa Fe, in August 1996 and continued through Tandil and Mar del Plata.

Track listing 
All songs written by Solari/Beilinson.

Personnel 
Patricio Rey
Indio Solari - Lead Vocals.
Skay Beilinson - Guitars.
Semilla Bucciarelli - Bass guitar.
Walter Sidotti - Drums.
Sergio Dawi - Saxophone.

Guest
Lito Vitale - Keyboards.
Rodolfo Yaria - Trumpet on "Fanfarria del cabrío".
Metaleira Mantequeira - Brass.

Additional personnel 
Poly - Management.
Rocambole - Art cover and design.

References 

Patricio Rey y sus Redonditos de Ricota albums
1996 albums